Ellisia is a genus of flowering plants in the forget-me-not family (Boraginaceae), containing the sole species Ellisia nyctelea. It is native to North America, where it is also known as Aunt Lucy, false baby blue eyes, and waterpod. The genus was named in honor of British naturalist John Ellis, a contemporary of, and correspondent to, Carl Linnaeus. It was published and described by Linnaeus, in his book Species Plantarum ed.2 on page 1662 in 1763.

Description
Lower leaves are arranged oppositely on a somewhat succulent stem, while upper leaves are alternate.

The small  flowers are found on short slender stalks arising from the leaf axils. Each flower has five white or light blue petals that are united at the base to form a tube; these may be streaked or dotted with purple coloration. The calyx is hairy, green, and has five large teeth.

Range and habitat
Ellisia nyctelea is widespread in North America, although it is largely absent from northern Canada, northern New England, the southeastern United States and the west coast of the United States. It is found both in disturbed, open habitats with bare soil, as well as in deciduous forests.

References

Hydrophylloideae
Flora of the United States
Flora of Canada
Monotypic asterid genera
Boraginaceae genera
Plants described in 1763